Haloarcula quadrata is a species of archaea discovered in a brine pool in the Sinai peninsula of Egypt. It was one of the first strains of prokaryotes whose cells show a flat, box-like shape.

They were categorized as Haloarcula on the basis of their polar lipid composition.

Morphology and metabolism

The cells move using single or multiple flagella but lack gas vacuoles. Species within the genus Haloarcula are Gram negative and extremely halophilic, and they can use any of several sources of carbon.

References

External links 

Type strain of Haloarcula quadrata at BacDive -  the Bacterial Diversity Metadatabase

Halobacteria
Archaea described in 1999